Engalukkum Kalam Varum is a 1967 Indian Tamil-language film directed and co-filmed by A. Vincent. The fim stars Nagesh and Padmini. It was released on 7 July 1967.

Plot

Cast 
 Nagesh
 Padmini
 T. S. Balaiah
 M. S. Sundari Bai
 Sachu
 Prabhakar

Production 
Engalukkum Kalam Varum was directed by A. Vincent, who also handled the cinematography with Sundaram. The film was produced by Sathyan under Pals & Company. The screenplay was written by Pasumani from a story by Sambumithra. Editing was handled by G. Venkatraman. Shooting took place at Bharani Studios.

Soundtrack 
The soundtrack was composed by T. K. Ramamoorthy, with lyrics by Kannadasan and Vaali.

Release and reception 
Engalukkum Kalam Varum was released on 7 July 1967, and distributed by Santhi Pictures. The Indian Express wrote, "Sitting through nearly three hours of the film, one can only say, how backward we are even in adapting Bengali stories". Kalki criticised the music, but said the film could be enjoyed for the cast performances.

References

External links 
 

1960s Tamil-language films
Films directed by A. Vincent
Films scored by T. K. Ramamoorthy